Rainer Berg (born 21 August 1965) is a German former professional footballer who played as a goalkeeper.

References

External links
 
 

1965 births
Living people
Sportspeople from Munich
German footballers
Association football goalkeepers
Germany under-21 international footballers
Bundesliga players
2. Bundesliga players
FC Bayern Munich II players
SV Darmstadt 98 players
TSV 1860 Munich players
1. FC Nürnberg players
SSV Jahn Regensburg players